Taça Nacional de São Tomé e Príncipe  is the top knockout tournament of the São Toméan Football Federation, it was created in 1981.  The cup winner of São Tome island competes with a cup winner from Príncipe Island.  The winner competes in (both) the São Tomé and Príncipe Super Cup (and the CAF Confederation Cup the following season, when a club also won a championship title, a second place club competes).

As with the national championship matches, the national cup competition are broadcast each year on the state network TVS, Santomean TV, the nation's only network.

When Príncipe Island had no competition until 1999, the second placed cup team competed in the competition up to 1999 and the last one in 2001.  In 2000 and 2001, the cup winner of Prínicipe first competed at the semis.

The editions from 2004 to 2006 were not held, as the same reason in the championships, due to several clubs that did not to be relegated.

Island or regional cup articles

Previous winners

Performance By Club

Performance By island and district

References

External links
RSSSF competition history

Football competitions in São Tomé and Príncipe
Sao Tome
1981 establishments in São Tomé and Príncipe
Recurring sporting events established in 1981